The 1972–73 Liga Leumit season saw Hakoah Ramat Gan win their second title, whilst Shimshon Tel Aviv and Hapoel Marmorek (in their first, and to date, only season in the top division) were relegated. Moshe Romano of Beitar Tel Aviv was the league's top scorer with 18 goals.

Final table

Results

References
Israel - List of final tables RSSSF

Liga Leumit seasons
Israel
1972–73 in Israeli football leagues